Frosted (stylised as FroSTed) was an American pop punk band, founded by ex-Go-Go's guitarist and singer Jane Wiedlin in 1995. The band was so-named because "it sounds sweet". The letters S and T were capitalised in tribute to Star Trek, one of Wiedlin's favourite TV shows. They released one album in 1996.

History
Wiedlin was joined by a second guitarist, Brian Waters, Sean Demott on bass and Lance Porter (of Ex-Idols) on drums. All three men provided additional vocals.

Frosted began by playing live in Los Angeles and San Francisco, before their sole album Cold, co-produced with Marc Waterman, was issued in August 1996. It was not a commercial success but was well received by critics. Allmusic describes the album as "bright, chunky, and radio-friendly without being gooey mainstream glop".

Rachel Haden was credited with singing, while a guesting Gerri Sutyak played cello. Four songs on the album were co-written with fellow Go Go's guitarist Charlotte Caffey.

The tracks "Bed" and "Call Me Crazy" were released as a single.

Frosted's last show was at 14 Below in Santa Monica, on 31 March 1998.

References

Pop punk groups from California
Musical quintets
Musical groups established in 1995
Musical groups disestablished in 1998
Geffen Records artists